Kirazcık is a village of Taşköprü District, Kastamonu Province, Turkey. Its population is 84 (2022).

Geography
Kirazcık is 78 km from Kastamonu and 36 km from Taşköprü. Forests cover more than %60 of the total area of the village. Climate of the village is Humid subtropical climate.

Population

Economy
The economy of the village is based on agriculture and animal husbandry.

Others
There is a primary school in the village but not in use today. The village has a drinking water network but does not have a sewer system. The village has electricity and telephone service as well.

References

Villages in Taşköprü District